The Anglican Diocese of Eastern Newfoundland and Labrador is one of seven dioceses of the Ecclesiastical Province of Canada in the Anglican Church of Canada. As of 2012 the diocese had 50,000 members in 81 congregations organised in 35 parishes. The most widely spread parish has thirteen congregations.

History
In 1976 the Diocese of Newfoundland was reorganised and three autonomous dioceses were created: Eastern Newfoundland and Labrador, Central Newfoundland, and Western Newfoundland.

Bishops of Eastern Newfoundland and Labrador
Robert Seaborn, 1965–1980 (1965–1976 as Bishop of Newfoundland); Metropolitan of Canada, 1975–1980
Martin Mate, 1980–1992
Don Harvey, 1993–2004
Cyrus Pitman, 2004–2013
Geoffrey Peddle, 2014–2020
Sam Rose, 2020–present

Parishes

Schools
Bishop Feild College

References

External links
Anglican Diocese of Eastern Newfoundland and Labrador official website
Diocese of Central Newfoundland website
Anglican Diocese of Eastern Newfoundland and Labrador website
Diocese of Western Newfoundland website
Queen's College website
Anglican Church of Canada official website

Anglican Church of Canada dioceses
Anglican Province of Canada